Brent Jennings (born January 1, 1951) is an American actor. He was born in Little Rock, Arkansas and is a 1969 graduate of Little Rock Central High School.

He played Oakland Athletics coach Ron Washington in the 2011 film Moneyball, played supporting character Ernie, traveling plumbing salesman in the short-lived, but acclaimed AMC television series ‘’Lodge 49’’ and currently stars in the TV series All American.

Filmography

Film

Television

References

External links 
 

1951 births
Living people
African-American male actors
American male film actors
American male television actors
Male actors from Little Rock, Arkansas
Little Rock Central High School alumni
20th-century American male actors
21st-century American male actors
American male stage actors
20th-century African-American people
21st-century African-American people